Waldo is a ghost town located in Josephine County, Oregon, United States, about three miles from the California border.   It was settled in 1852 as a gold mining camp called Sailor's Diggings. 
The place was later renamed "Waldo" in honor of William Waldo, who in 1853 was the Whig candidate for governor of California. This was apparently because, believing the settlement was in California, William Waldo campaigned there and convinced the populace that they should vote for him.  The town was the first county seat of Josephine County.  The post office for Waldo was established in 1856; service was discontinued in 1928.

See also
List of ghost towns in Oregon

References

External links
Waldo, Oregon History

Former populated places in Josephine County, Oregon
Ghost towns in Oregon
1852 establishments in Oregon Territory
Former county seats in Oregon